Tonestus eximius is a species of flowering plant in the family Asteraceae known by the common names Lake Tahoe serpentweed and Tahoe tonestus. It is native to the High Sierra Nevada, where it is known only from the vicinity of Lake Tahoe on the California-Nevada border. It grows in alpine and subalpine mountain habitat. It is a short, clumpy perennial herb growing up to 13 centimeters tall. The thick stems are hairless and glandular, the lower parts covered in the withered leaf bases of previous seasons' growth. The toothed or serrated leaf blades are up to 3 to 5 centimeters in length. The inflorescence is a single flower head or a cluster of a few heads. Each is 1 to 1.5 centimeters wide with green phyllaries. The head bears at least 10 bright yellow ray florets around a center containing many tubular disc florets.

References

External links
Jepson Manual Treatment
Flora of North America
Photo gallery

Astereae
Flora of California
Flora of Nevada
Flora without expected TNC conservation status